Craig Mountain Wildlife Management Area at  is an Idaho wildlife management area in Nez Perce County along the Snake River in southern Lewiston. The WMA is cooperatively managed by the Idaho Department of Fish and Game and the Bureau of Land Management. 

The WMA provides habitat for mule deer, elk, wild turkey, and other game species. Bighorn sheep were reintroduced to the WMA in 1983.

References

Protected areas established in 1971
Protected areas of Nez Perce County, Idaho
Wildlife management areas of Idaho